Ahal Änew Football Club , or simply Ahal FC, is a Turkmen professional association football club based in the Änew, Ahal Province. Founded in 1989, the club played its first-ever top flight season in 1992. The club plays its home matches at the 20,000 seater Ashgabat Stadium.

Ahal won the 2022 Ýokary Liga, becoming one of eight clubs to have won the Ýokary Liga since its inception in 1992.

History

During 1989–91, the club participated in the Soviet Second League.

FC Ahal played in the top division of Turkmenistan in 1992, winning bronze medal, but the following year the team was disbanded. The returning season was 1998–99.

In 2013, the team won Cup title, led by Ali Gurbani. In 2013 Turkmenistan Cup final team beat Altyn Asyr and won the trophy for the second time.

In 2014 season the team began by winning the 2014 Super Cup of Turkmenistan, beating HTTU (4–2). In October 2014 the new coach was appointed, Guwançmuhammet Öwekow, which resulted in a victory in the 2014 Turkmenistan Cup, having beaten Balkan (2–1).

In the 2015 season, FC Ahal debuted in AFC Cup, becoming the new dominant force of Turkmenistan football.

In the 2021 Ýokary Liga, FC Ahal won silver medals in the championship for the 7th time and received the right to take part in the 2022 AFC Champions League. Only Ahal were granted an AFC Champions League license, as the Ýokary Liga champions FC Altyn Asyr were only eligible for the 2022 AFC Cup.

Domestic

Continental history

Honours
 Turkmenistan Higher League
Champions (1): 2022
Runners-up (6): 2014, 2017, 2018, 2019, 2020, 2021
Turkmenistan Cup
Champions (4): 2013, 2014, 2017, 2022
Runners-up (2): 2019, 2021
Turkmenistan Super Cup
Champions (1): 2014
Runners-up (3): 2015, 2018, 2020

Current squad

Personnel

Team management

Corporate hierarchy

Managers
 Amangylyç Koçumow (2000)
 Armen Sogomonyan (2005)
 Ali Gurbani (2005)
 Durdy Redzhepov (2008)
 Armen Sogomonyan (2011)
 Baýram Durdyýew (2012)
 Ali Gurbani (2013–14)
 Guwançmuhammet Öwekow (2014–20??)
 Röwşen Meredow (September 2016 – September 2019)
  Amangylyç Koçumow (September 2019 – October 2019)
  Baýramnyýaz Berdiýew (November 2019 – January 2020)
  Hojaahmet Arazow (January 2020 – August 2020)
  Said Seýidow (August 2020 – December 2020)
  Hojaahmet Arazow (January 2021 – December 2021)
  Mergen Orazov (January 2022 – until now)

Kit suppliers and shirt sponsors 
The team is owned by the Türkmen Nebit Önümleri (Turkmen Petroleum Products) enterprise.

Players on international cups

References

External links
 Ahal – FIFA
Ahal – GSA

Football clubs in Turkmenistan
1989 establishments in Turkmenistan
Association football clubs established in 1989